The Ket  language, or more specifically Imbak and formerly known as Yenisei Ostyak , is a Siberian language long thought to be an isolate, the sole surviving language of a Yeniseian language family. It is spoken along the middle Yenisei basin by the Ket people.

The language is threatened with extinction—the number of ethnic Kets that are native speakers of the language dropped from 1,225 in 1926 to 537 in 1989. According to the UNESCO census, this number has since fallen to 150. A 2005 census reported 485 native speakers, but this number is suspected to be inflated. According to a local news source, the number of remaining Ket speakers is around 10 to 20. Another Yeniseian language, Yugh, is believed to have recently become extinct.

Documentation 
The earliest observations about the language were published by P. S. Pallas in 1788 in a travel diary (Путешествия по разным провинциям Русского Государства Puteshestviya po raznim provintsiyam Russkogo Gosudarstva). M.A. Castrén was one of the last known to study the Kott language. Castrén lived beside the Kan river with five people of Kott, in which is believed was the last remaining people who spoke the language. In 1858, M. A. Castrén published the first grammar and dictionary (Versuch einer jenissei-ostjakischen und Kottischen Sprachlehre), which also included material on the Kot language. During the 19th century, the Ket were mistaken for a tribe of the Finno-Ugric Khanty. A. Karger in 1934 published the first grammar (Кетский язык Ketskij jazyk), as well as a Ket primer (Букварь на кетском языке Bukvar' na ketskom jazyke), and a new treatment appeared in 1968, written by A. Kreinovich.

Dialects 
Ket has three dialects: Southern, Central and Northern dialects. All the dialects are very similar to each other and Kets are able to understand each other from all dialects. However the most common southern dialect was used for the written model of Ket.

Phonology

Vowels

Consonants 
Vajda analyses Ket as having only 12 consonant phonemes:

There is much allophony, and the phonetic inventory of consonants is essentially as below. This is the level of description reflected by the Ket alphabet.

Furthermore, all nasal consonants in Ket have voiceless allophones at the end of a monosyllabic word with a glottalized or descending tone (i.e.  turn into ), likewise,  becomes  in the same situation.

Tone 
Descriptions of Ket vary widely in the number of contrastive tones they report: as many as eight and as few as zero have been counted. Given this wide disagreement, whether or not Ket is a tonal language is debatable, although recent works by Ket specialists Edward Vajda and Stefan Georg defend the existence of tone.

In tonal descriptions, Ket does not employ a tone on every syllable but instead uses one tone per word. Following Vajda's description of Southern Ket, the five basic tones are as follows:

The glottalized tone features pharyngeal or laryngeal constriction, or a full glottal stop that interrupts the vowel.

Georg's 2007 description of Ket tone is similar to the above, but reduces the basic number of tonemes to four, while moving the rising high-falling tone plus a variant to a class of tonemes only found in multisyllabic words. With some exceptions caused by certain prefixes or clitics, the domain of tones in a multisyllabic word is limited to the first two syllables. Some research has shown tone alternation in the absolutive plural.

Grammar

Ket is classified as a synthetic language. The verbs use prefixes and infixes, suffixes are rare. Nevertheless, incorporation is well-developed.
The division between morphemes is based on fusion.  Sandhi are common as well.
The basic word order is subject-object-verb SOV.
The name marking is of Ezāfe-type, the same as in predication.

Examples of sentences 
 bu du-taRɔt (He lies/sleeps);
 ətn en dʌŋ-ɔtn (We are walking already);
 bu ətn d-il'-daŋ-s (He attracted us).

 Parts of speech 
Nouns have nominative basic case (subjects and direct objects) and a system of secondary cases for spatial relations. The three noun classes are: masculine, feminine and inanimate. 

Ket makes significant use of incorporation. Incorporation is not limited to nouns, and can also include verbs, adverbs, adjectives, and bound morphemes found only in the role of incorporated elements. Incorporation also occurs as both a lexicalized process – the combination of verb and incorporate being treated as a distinct lexical element, with a meaning often based around the incorporated element – and a paradigmatic one, where the incorporation is performed spontaneously for particular semantic and pragmatic effect Forms of incorporation include:Nominal incorporation, most commonly used to describe the instrumental part of an action, but sometimes used to describe patients instead. Instrumental incorporation doesn't affect the transitivity of the verb (though there are examples where this form of incorporation is used to describe agentless changes of state), while patient incorporation can make a transitive verb intransitive. Patient incorporation is usually used for patients that are wholly effected by an action (such as being brought into existence by it); more generally affected patients are typically incorporated only when significantly defocused or backgrounded.Verbal incorporation, more specifically the incorporation of verbal infinitives (rather than roots) into the verb complex. This form of incorporation is used to signify aspect and form causatives. Incorporated infinitives may bring incorporated elements of their own into the verb as well.Adjectival incorporation, with an incorporated adjective describing the target or final state of an action.Adverbial incorporation''', where a local adverb is used to describe the direction or path of a movement.

 Ket alphabet 
In the 1930s a Latin-based alphabet was developed and used:

In the 1980s a new, Cyrillic-based, alphabet was created:

 Decline and current use 
Ket people were subjected to collectivization in the 1930s. In the 1950s and 1960s, according to the recollections of informants, they were sent to Russian-only boarding schools, which led to the ceasing of language transmission between generations. Now, Ket is taught as a subject in some primary schools, but only older adults are fluent and few are raising their children with the language. Kellog, Russia is the only place where Ket is still taught in schools. Special books are provided for grades second through fourth but after those grades there is only Russian Literature to read that describes Ket culture. There are no known monolingual speakers as of 2006. A children's book, A Bit Lost by Chris Haught, was translated into the language in 2013. Alexander Kotusov was a Ket folk singer and poet who died in 2019.

 Loanwords 
The Ket language has many loanwords from the Russian language, such as mora 'sea' but Ket also contains loanwords from other languages such as Selkup, for example: the word "qopta" 'ox' comes from the Selkup word "qobda". Ket also has some Mongolian words, such as: saˀj 'tea' from Mongolian tsaj. And from Evenki, for example: the word saˀl 'tobacco' is possibly borrowed from Evenki sâr 'tobacco'.

 References 

 Literature 
 
 
 
 
 
 
 
 Kotorova, Elizaveta, and Andrey Nefedov (eds.) (2015). Comprehensive Ket Dictionary / Большой словарь кетского языка (2 vols). Languages of the World/Dictionaries (LW/D) 57. Munich: Lincom Europa.

 External links 

 Endangered Languages of the Indigenous Peoples of Siberia – The Ket Language
 Ket language vocabulary with loanwords (from the World Loanword Database)
 Filtchenko, Andrei. 2001. Ket Language
 Georg, Stefan. 2006. A Descriptive Grammar of Ket (Yenisei-Ostyak). Folkestone, Kent: Global Oriental. 
 Kazakevich, Olga, et al. 2006?. Multimedia Database of Ket Language, Moscow State (Lomonosov) University
 Lueders, Ulrich. Books: Language Description, Ket: Vajda. Publisher's announcement on LINGUIST List
 Vajda, Edward J. 2000. Ket and other Yeneseic Peoples
 Vajda, Edward J. 2006. The Ket People – Google Video
 Table of contents and ordering information for The Dene–Yeniseian Connection.
 Notices and news items on Dene–Yeniseian
 Viikberg, Jüri. Kets. In The Red Book of the Peoples of the Russian Empire'', NGO Red Book,  (Wikipedia article)
Ket basic lexicon at the Global Lexicostatistical Database
Silent Extinction: Language Loss Reaches Crisis Levels

Ket people
Languages of Russia
Yeniseian languages
Krasnoyarsk Krai
Severely endangered languages

de:Jenisseische Sprachen#Das Ketische